Björn Oskar Ingemar Åkesson (born 4 January 1989) is a Swedish professional golfer.

Åkesson had a promising youth career and in 2006, at 17, became the youngest ever winner of the Duncan Putter at Southerndown Golf Club in Wales, until the event was won by 15-year-old Tim Harry in 2013. 

Åkesson was the runner-up at the 2006 Boys Amateur Championship, and in 2007 he won the Polo Golf Junior Classic at the Reunion Resort in the United States. He made his debut on the European Tour in 2006 after winning the amateur qualifications for the Nordea Masters in Sweden.

Åkesson played on the 2013 European Tour after earning his European Tour card through Q School in 2012. His best result was a 5th place at the Tshwane Open in South Africa. Åkesson qualified for play on the 2016 European Tour through graduation on the 2015 Challenge Tour. He secured his card after finishing second in The Foshan Open, 2 strokes behind Borja Virto of Spain. Åkesson had a good start to 2016 with a tie for third place at the Joburg Open in South Africa

Amateur wins
2006 Duncan Putter
2007 TourGolf Open, Polo Golf Junior Classic
Source:

Professional wins (1)

Nordic Golf League wins (1)

Team appearances
Amateur
 European Boys' Team Championship (representing Sweden): 2005, 2006
Eisenhower Trophy (representing Sweden): 2006
 Jacques Léglise Trophy (representing the Continent of Europe): 2006 (winners)
 European Amateur Team Championship (representing Sweden): 2007, 2008
Bonallack Trophy (representing Europe): 2008 (winners)
 St Andrews Trophy (representing the Continent of Europe): 2008

See also
2012 European Tour Qualifying School graduates
2015 Challenge Tour graduates

References

External links

Swedish male golfers
European Tour golfers
Sportspeople from Malmö
1989 births
Living people
21st-century Swedish people